Monika Brzeźna (born 12 October 1991) is a Polish professional racing cyclist. She rode in the women's road race at the 2015 UCI Road World Championships.

References

External links

1991 births
Living people
Polish female cyclists
Sportspeople from Wrocław
Cyclists at the 2015 European Games
European Games competitors for Poland
Cyclists at the 2019 European Games
21st-century Polish women